Humiriaceae (or, alternatively Houmiriaceae Juss.) is a family of evergreen flowering plants. It comprises 8 genera and 56 known species. The family is exclusively Neotropical, except one species found in tropical West Africa.

References

 
Malpighiales families